Milne-Edwards is a surname. Notable people with the surname include:

 Henri Milne-Edwards (1800–1885), French zoologist
 Alphonse Milne-Edwards (1835–1900), French ornithologist and carcinologist, a son of Henri Milne-Edwards

See also
 Milne (surname)
 Edwards (surname)
 

Compound surnames
French-language surnames
Surnames of English origin